Giovanni Zaro (born 12 May 1994) is an Italian professional footballer who plays as a centre back for  club Südtirol.

Club career
Born in Vanzaghello, Zaro made his senior debut on 16 November 2013 for Serie C2 club Castiglione against Rimini, on loan from Inter Milan.

For the 2014–15 season, he was loaned to Pro Patria, and signed for the club the next year. Zaro played more than 100 matches for the club in six seasons.

On 11 July 2019, he left Pro Patria and joined Serie C club Modena.

On 15 July 2021, he joined Südtirol.

International career
Zaro was a youth international for Italy.

Honours
Pro Patria
 Serie D: 2017–18

References

External links
 
 

1994 births
Living people
Sportspeople from the Metropolitan City of Milan
Footballers from Lombardy
Italian footballers
Association football defenders
Serie B players
Serie C players
Serie D players
Inter Milan players
Aurora Pro Patria 1919 players
Modena F.C. 2018 players
F.C. Südtirol players
Italy youth international footballers